Marinomonas rhizomae is a bacterium from the genus of Marinomonas which has been isolated from the seagrass Posidonia oceanica.

References

Oceanospirillales
Bacteria described in 2011